Max John Choboian (March 17, 1942 – January 2, 1977) was an American collegiate and Professional Football quarterback who played professionally in the American Football League (AFL). Born in Tulare, California, he played only one season in the AFL for the Denver Broncos and started seven games. He died of lung cancer.

See also
List of American Football League players

References

External links

1942 births
1977 deaths
People from Tulare, California
American football quarterbacks
Players of American football from California
Sportspeople from Tulare County, California
Oregon Ducks football players
Denver Broncos (AFL) players
Deaths from lung cancer in the United States
Place of death missing